is a city located in Yamanashi Prefecture, Japan. ,  the city had an estimated population of 73,626, and a population density of 1,100 persons per km².

Geography
Kai is located in central Yamanashi Prefecture, orientated north-south along the banks of the Fuji River.

Surrounding municipalities
Yamanashi Prefecture
 Nirasaki
 Hokuto
 Minami-Alps
 Kōfu
 Shōwa

Climate
The city has a climate characterized by characterized by hot and humid summers, and relatively mild winters (Köppen climate classification Cfa).  The average annual temperature in Kai is 14.3 °C. The average annual rainfall is 1240 mm with September as the wettest month. The temperatures are highest on average in August, at around 26.7 °C, and lowest in January, at around 2.4 °C.

Demographics
Per Japanese census data, the population of Kai more than tripled between 1960 and 2000 and has grown at a slower pace since.

History
The area of present day Kai was part of ancient Kai Province and have numerous Jomon period ruins. During the Sengoku period, warlord Takeda Shingen built embankments on the Kamanashi River for flood control and to open up new rice lands. During the Edo period, all of Kai Province was tenryō territory under direct control of the Tokugawa shogunate.

The city of Kai was established on September 1, 2004, from the merger of the town of Futaba (from Kitakoma District), and the towns of Ryūō and Shikishima (both from Nakakoma District). It takes its name from the old name for Yamanashi Prefecture, Kai Province.

Government
Kai has a mayor-council form of government with a directly elected mayor and a unicameral city legislature of 19 members.

Education
Kai has eleven public elementary schools and five public middle schools operated by the city government and one public high school operated by the Yamanashi Prefectural Board of Education.

Transportation

Railway
 Central Japan Railway Company - Chūō Main Line
  -

Highway
  Chūō Expressway
 Chūbu-Ōdan Expressway

Sister city relations
 Keokuk, Iowa, USA

Notable people
Shin Nakagomi – professional baseball player
Youichi Imamura – professional racecar driver
Karin Ogino – former idol

References

External links

Official Website 

 
Cities in Yamanashi Prefecture